The Roman Catholic Archdiocese of Embrun was located in southeastern France, in the mountains of the Maritime Alps, on a route that led from Gap by way of Briançon to Turin.  It had as suffragans the Diocese of Digne, Diocese of Antibes and Grasse, Diocese of Vence, Diocese of Glandèves, Diocese of Senez and Diocese of Nice.  Its see was the Cathedral of Nôtre Dame in Embrun.

The former French Roman Catholic Archdiocese of Embrun was suppressed after the French Revolution.  It was replaced, under the Civil Constitution of the Clergy (1790) by a diocese which had the same boundaries of the civil departement in which it was located.  The diocese was called 'Haute-Alpes', with its center at Gap.

When the Diocese of Gap was re-established in 1822 it comprised, besides the ancient Diocese of Gap, a large part of the ancient archdiocese of Embrun. The name of the metropolitan see of Embrun, however, had been absorbed in the title of the Archbishop of Aix-en-Provence and Arles, until 2007.  In 2008, the title of Embrun  was reattached to the Diocese of Gap by papal decree of Pope Benedict XVI.

History
 
Tradition ascribes the evangelization of Embrun to Saints Nazarius and Celsus, martyrs under emperor Nero.  Gregory of Tours states that they were martyred at Embrun. Their bodies, however, were discovered in a cemetery in Milan by Saint Ambrose.  They were also drowned at Trier, on orders of the Emperor Nero.  Their entire story is without historical foundation, and a mass of contradictions and improbabilities.  According to another tradition, the first Bishop of Embrun, Saint Marcellus, was such a successful preacher that, by the end of his episcopacy, there was not a single pagan left in the diocese.

The see became an archbishopric about 800. In 1056 Pope Victor confirmed the Archbishop of Embrun as Metropolitan of the Sees of Digne, Chorges, Solliès, Senez, Glandèves, Cimiez-Nice, Vence, and Antibes (Grasse).  Bishop Winimann was also granted the pallium  In 1276 the Archbishops of Embrun were made Princes of the Holy Roman Empire.

The see was suppressed in the French Revolution, being transferred to the diocese of Gap, and the cathedral church became a mere parish church.

Notable Bishops of Embrun

St. Guillaume (1120–34), founder of the Abbey of Boscodon; 
Henry of Segusio (1250–71), known as (H)Ostiensis, i.e. Cardinal Bishop of Ostia, an orator and canonist of renown; 
Bertrand de Déaulx (1323–38), who as the legate of Clement VI at Rome did much to bring about the downfall of Rienzi; 
Giulio de' Medici (1510–11), later pope under the name of Clement VII; 
Cardinal François de Tournon (1517–26), employed on diplomatic missions by King Francis I of France, and founder of the College de Tournon; 
Cardinal de Tencin (1724–40), who in September, 1727, caused the condemnation by the Council of Embrun of the *Jansenist Soanen, Bishop of his suffragan see of Senez.
St. Vincent Ferrer preached several missions against the Vaudois in the Diocese of Embrun.

Bishops

 † by 374:  Marcellinus. 
 374: Artemius
c. 400: Jacob 
 439: Armentarius 
 440-† ca 475: Ingenuus
 517:  Catulinus 
 Gallicanus
 Palladius of Embrun
 541-549:  Gallicanus
 567-579: Salonius
 Emeritus 585- 588
 Lopacharus  614
c. 630:  Albin
c. 650 to c. 653: Ætherius
 [Chramlinus]
 [c. 740: Vualchinus],  founded Novalesa Abbey.
c. 791–794: Marcellus

Archbishops

c. 800–1200

Bernardus
 829: Agericus
c. 853 to c. 859: Aribertus  (or Arbertus)
 876: Bermond
 878: Aribert II.
 886:  Ermoldus (or Ermaldus or  Ermold) 886 or 887   
 890-899:  Arnaud (or Arnaudus)
 900–916: Benedict 
 920: Liberalis of Embrun (920-40)
 943–960: Boson
c. 970: Amadeus
 992: Pontius
 1007–1010: Ismidias
c. 1016 to c. 1027: Radon
c. 1033–1044: Ismidon
c. 1048: Vivemnus (Winnamanus)
 1050–1054: Guinervinarius
 1054–1055: Hugues
 1055–1065: Winnimanus (Guinamand)
 1066–1077: Guillaume
 1077: Peter 
c. 1080–1084: Lantelmus
 1105–1118: Benedict II.
 1120–1134: Guillaume II.
 1135 to 7 December 1169: Guillaume III. 
 9 January 1170 to 1176: Raimond I.
c. 1177–1189: Pierre II. Romain
 1189–1208: Guillaume IV. de Benevento

c. 1200–1500

 1208 to c. 1212: Raimond II. Sédu
 1212 to c. 1235: Bernard  Chabert
 1236 to 23. May 1245: Aimar
 1246–1250: Humbert
 1250 to May 1262: Henri de Suse (Henricus de Bartholomeis)
 1263–1286: Jacques Sérène
 4 August 1286 to 1289: Guillaume V.
 8 October 1289 to 28 June 1294: Raimond de Médullion
 28 March 1295 to 26 May 1311: Guillaume de Mandagot (promoted to the See of Aix)
 22 May 1311 to 1317: Jean du Puy, O.P.
 1319 to c. 1323: Raimond IV. Robaud
 5 September 1323 to 1338: Bertrand de Déaulx
 27. January 1338 to 17. December 1350: Pasteur de Sarrats, O.Min.
 16. February 1351 to 1361: Guillaume VII. de Bordes
 1361–1364: Raimond V. de Salges
 8 January 1364 to 5. September 1365: Bertrand II. de Castelnau
 1365–1366: Bernard II.
 1366 to 18 December 1378: Pierre Amelii (d'Ameil)
 20 May 1379 to 1 May 1427: Michel Etienne Delisle (de Insula), appointed by Pope Clement VII of the Avignon Obedience
 30 July 1427 to 7 September 1432: Jacques Gelu
 1432 to 17 January 1457: Jean II. Girard
 1457 to c. 1470: Jean III de Montmagny
c. 1470–1494: Jean IV. Baile
 1494–1510: Rostaing d'Ancezune

from 1500

 1510–1511: Giulio di Giuliano de' Medici
 1511–1516: Niccolò Fieschi (Fiesque), Cardinal
 1517–1525: François de Tournon
 1526–1551: Antoine de Lévis de Château-Morand
 1551–1555: Balthasar de Jarente
 1555: Louis de Laval de Bois-Dauphin
 1556–1560: Robert Cardinal de Lenoncourt
 1561–1600: Guillaume d'Avançon de Saint-Marcel, Cardinal
 1601–1612: Honoré du Laurens
 1612–1648: Guillaume d'Hugues
 1649–1669: Georges d'Aubusson de La Feuillade (transferred to Metz)
 1669–1714: Charles Brûlart de Genlis
 1715–1719: François-Elie de Voyer de Paulmy d'Argenson
 1719–1724: Jean-François-Gabriel de Hénin-Liétard
 1724–1740: Pierre Guérin de Tencin (appointed Archbishop of Lyon on 11 November 1740)
 1741–1767: Bernardin-François Fouquet
 1767–1790: Pierre-Louis de Leyssin
 1791–1793: Ignace Cazeneuve (Constitutional Bishop of Hautes-Alpes)

See also
 Catholic Church in France
 List of Catholic dioceses in France
 Croix de Provence on the Montagne Sainte-Victoire

References

Bibliography

Reference works

 pp. 548–549. (Use with caution; obsolete)
  (Use with caution; obsolete)

  (in Latin) pp. 233–234.
 (in Latin) p. 148.
 p. 190.
 pp. 179.
 pp. 190–191.
 p. 203.

Acknowledgment

Studies

 second edition (in French)

External links
 

 
Embrun
Embrun
4th-century establishments in Roman Gaul